Dakota Collegiate is a grade 9 to 12 public high school in  Winnipeg, Manitoba, Canada with an enrollment of 1235 students as of January 2020. Dakota offers Advanced Placement courses in limited subject areas, that include mathematics and the sciences. On May 3, 2014, the school celebrated its 50th anniversary.

History
Dakota Collegiate opened in 1963 with 200 students and 20 teachers. In June 1964, there were 72 students in the first graduating class. Dakota began as an experimental team-teaching school and offered only University Entrance courses. Dakota now has roughly 1200 students, approximately 60 teachers, and offers over 120 courses. In 2012, it had a graduating class of roughly 280 students.

The Dakota Collegiate Lancers have earned 590 provincial sports titles since the school was founded.

21st Century Learning 1:1 Initiative
During the 2011-2012 school year, Dakota Collegiate introduced the 21st Century Learning One-to-One initiative, in which all grade nine students were required to purchase their own laptop computer to use in their classes. The computers were used to complete assignments, create presentations, and research information. This initiative continued in the 2012-2013 school year, with grade 9 and 10 students requiring laptops, and an open invitation for students in higher grades to bring their own devices if they desire.

Murray Field
After 54 years of Dakota Collegiate's opening, the school never played a single home football game until the school raised money for "the field of dreams" project. The school started fund raising money in late 2015 for a brand new football field, outdoor basketball court and a cricket pitch. Dakota finished the project in late 2017. It took over $3,000,000 to complete building the football field, and it took over $180,000 to complete the basketball court. Fundraising for the project was through gala dinners with guest speakers such as Troy Westwood, Matt Dunigan, Milt Stegall, Rod Hill, Dale Hawerchuk, Mark Scheifele, Jon Montgomery, and Donovan Bailey. The field got its name from a $250,000 donation from the family of auto dealer Dan Murray. The basketball court was named after former Dakota Collegiate coach and teacher Dale Bradshaw. Between 1968 and 1982, Bradshaw coached Dakota Collegiate to five provincial basketball titles. In 2019, it was announced that the city of Winnipeg would be funding two new tennis and pickleball courts. The courts grand opening was held on October 5, 2020.

Notable alumni
Janet Arnott, curling coach, 2014 Winter Olympics gold medallist
Kate Cameron, curler
Monica Goermann, gymnast
Elijah Harper, politician
Brad Katona, UFC fighter 
Scott Koskie, Setter for the Canadian National Men's Volleyball Team (1995–2007)
Connie Laliberte, curler
Tricia Mayba, professional volleyball player 
Dylan McIlrath, NHL player 
Briane Meilleur, curler
Theresa Oswald, politician
Corinne Peters, curler
Shai Ross, professional football player

References

External links
Dakota Collegiate's Website
Louis Riel School Division Website
Dakota Collegiate - About Us

High schools in Winnipeg
Educational institutions established in 1963
1963 establishments in Manitoba
St. Vital, Winnipeg